The 2013 ARCA Racing Series presented by Menards was the 61st season of the ARCA Racing Series. The season began on February 16 with the Lucas Oil 200 presented by MAVTV American Real and ended on October 4 with the Kansas ARCA 150. James Hylton retired from driving at the end of the season at the age of 79.

Teams and drivers
THIS TABLE IS UNDER CONSTRUCTION / A WORK IN PROGRESS

Complete schedule

Limited schedule
THIS TABLE IS COMING SOON

Notes

Schedule

The 2013 series schedule was announced in November 2012.

Results and standings

Races

Point standings

(key) Bold – Pole position awarded by time. Italics – Pole position set by final practice results or rainout. * – Most laps led.

See also
 2013 NASCAR Sprint Cup Series
 2013 NASCAR Nationwide Series
 2013 NASCAR Camping World Truck Series
 2013 NASCAR K&N Pro Series East
 2013 NASCAR K&N Pro Series West
 2013 NASCAR Canadian Tire Series
 2013 NASCAR Toyota Series
 2013 NASCAR Whelen Euro Series

References

External links

ARCA
ARCA Menards Series seasons